Richard Schmidt (born 23 May 1987) is a German representative sweep-oar rower. He is a six time world champion, a four time Olympian, an Olympic gold & silver medallist and has held a seat in the German senior men's eight—the Deutschlandachter—constantly from 2009 to 2021. He rowed at seven when the Deutschlandachter at the 2017 World Rowing Cup II set a world's best time of 5.18.68, still the standing world mark as of 2021.

He was in the German crew that won the gold medal in the men's eight competition at the 2012 Summer Olympics in London. At the 2016 Summer Olympics in Rio de Janeiro, he rowed in Germany's men's eight which won the silver medal. He has been selected in the German Olympic rowing squad for Tokyo 2021 and is expected to again row in the German men's eight for his third Olympic appearance.

Representative rowing career
Schmidt's club rowing was from Ruderverein Treviris 1921 in Trier, Germany. His international representative debut was at the junior level, when he won consecutive medals in the German coxless four at the World Rowing Junior Championships in 2004 and 2005. In 2007, he raced at the World Rowing U23 Championships in Glasgow in a coxless four with Sebastian Schmidt, Fokke Beckmann and Kristof Wilke where they won a gold medal. In Autumn 2007, that crew finished in second place at the European Rowing Championships in Poznań after taking a long break from the sport.

In 2008, Schmidt rowed with Beckmann at the World Cup opener in Munich in the coxless pair and at the end of the season was selected in the German eight for the U23 World Championships, where they placed fourth. During this time, the seating of the German men's eight was reorganised prior to the 2008 Olympic Games, Schmidt was selected as a travelling reserve for Beijing. He raced in the semi-finals with Marco Neumann, Gregor Hauffe, and Urs Käufer in the coxless four as Filip Adamski and Toni Seifert were ill. The newly composed team had surprisingly reached the final, however Neumann was then replaced with Jochen Urban. The boat finished in sixth place.

In the new Olympiad, the coxless four formed the core of the re-built German eight, in which Schmidt then won his first World Championship title at the 2009 World Rowing Championships. In 2010 at the World Rowing Cup I he rowed in a coxless pair with Kristof Wilke but within a month he secured his seat in the German eight rowing in the European Championships in September and then at World Championships where they defended their World Championship title. With Schmidt solid in the five seat, the German crew won their third consecutive title at the 2011 World Championships. At the 2012 Olympics in London, the favoured German eight won the gold medal with a crew consisting of Filip Adamski, Andreas Kuffner, Eric Johannesen, Maximilian Reinelt, Richard Schmidt, Lukas Müller, Florian Mennigen, Kristof Wilke and coxswain Martin Sauer.

After his first Olympic success, Richard Schmidt rowed on and remained constant in the German eight who since 2010 have been strong, permanent rivals against the British men's eight. From 2013 to 2015, the German team won gold each year at the European Rowing Championships but come the World Championship finals, the Great Britain pipped them each time by a margin of less than one second relegating the German eight to three consecutive silver medals. In the lead-up to Rio 2016 Germany again finished either first or second at each regatta in the international season. In Rio the German crew won their heat but in the final were again beaten by Great Britain with a 1.33 second margin. Schmidt now had his second Olympic medal – a silver.

In 2017 Schmidt, Malte Jakschik, the stroke Hannes Ocik and coxswain Martin Sauer were the only members of the German Olympic eight who rowed on. The eight was rebuilt around the stern three of Ocik, Schmidt & Jakschik. He remained throughout their dominant season campaign, winning gold at the European Championships, two World Rowing Cups and ultimately at the 2017 World Rowing Championships in Sarasota, Florida where the German eight were again crowned as world champions. In June 2017 at the World Rowing Cup II in Poznan they set a new world's best time for the eight, taking 0.67 seconds off a 2012 mark set by Canada.  The German crew with every man holding the same seat, continued their European and world dominance throughout 2018 winning at three World Rowing Cups, the 2018 European Championships and then defending their world title at the 2018 World Rowing Championships in Plovdiv. There were a handful of changes to the German eight in 2019 but Schmidt remained at seven for another successful international season culminating in his sixth world championship title at the 2019 World Rowing Championships in Ottensheim.

The German men's eight's 2019 performances qualified that boat for Tokyo 2020. By the time of the 2021 selections for those delayed Olympics, Schmidt was still in the crew and set to make his third Olympic rowing appearance.

Personal
Schmidt studied engineering and undertook his PhD in engineering. For his Olympic medal achievements he has twice been awarded the Silver Laurel Leaf by German Federal President Joachim Gauck. Since 2019 he has been an athlete representative on the World Anti-Doping Agency's Athlete Committee.

Rowing palmares
 2004: Bronze medal World Rowing Junior Championships – M4-
 2005: Silver medal World Rowing Junior Championships – M4-
 2007: Gold medal World Rowing U23 Championships – M4-
 2007: Silver medal European Rowing Championships – M4-
 2008: 4th place World Rowing U23 Championships – M8+
 2008: 4th place European Rowing Championships  – M8+
 2008: 6th place  Beijing Olympics – M4-
 2009: Gold medal World Rowing Championships  – M8+
 2010: Gold medal European and World Rowing Championships  – M8+
 2011: Gold medal World Rowing Championships  – M8+
 2012: Gold medal London Olympics – M8+
 2013: Gold medal European Rowing Championships  – M8+
 2013: Silver medal World Rowing Championships  – M8+
 2014: Gold medal European Rowing Championships  – M8+
 2014: Silver medal World Rowing Championships  – M8+
 2015: Gold medal European Rowing Championships  – M8+
 2015: Silver medal World Rowing Championships  – M8+
 2016: Silver medal Rio de Janeiro Olympics  – M8+
 2017: Gold medal European and World Rowing Championships  – M8+
 2018: Gold medal European and World Rowing Championships  – M8+
 2019: Gold medal European and World Rowing Championships  – M8+

References

External links

1987 births
Living people
Rowers at the 2008 Summer Olympics
Rowers at the 2012 Summer Olympics
Rowers at the 2016 Summer Olympics
Rowers at the 2020 Summer Olympics
Olympic rowers of Germany
Sportspeople from Trier
Olympic gold medalists for Germany
Olympic medalists in rowing
Medalists at the 2012 Summer Olympics
German male rowers
World Rowing Championships medalists for Germany
Olympic silver medalists for Germany
Medalists at the 2016 Summer Olympics
Recipients of the Silver Laurel Leaf
Medalists at the 2020 Summer Olympics